Sydney Widmer Seaward (27 January 1884 – 22 June 1967) was an English actor born in Blindley Heath, Godstone, Surrey, England, United Kingdom and died at age 83 in Matlock, Derbyshire, England, United Kingdom.

Selected filmography
 Pierre of the Plains (1914)
 The Amateur Gentleman (1920)
 The Tidal Wave (1920)
 The Woman of His Dream (1921)
 The Yellow Claw (1921)
 A Gentleman of France (1921)
 The Night Hawk (1921)
 A Debt of Honour (1922)
 The Loves of Mary, Queen of Scots (1923)
 Bonnie Prince Charlie (1923)
 Trainer and Temptress (1925)
 The King's Highway (1927)
 A South Sea Bubble (1928)
 Contraband Love (1931)
 The Flaw (1933)

Selected stage performances
 It Pays to Advertise, (1914-1915), Broadway
 Journey's End, (1929), Henry Miller Theatre
 Over The Page, (1932–33), Alhambra Theatre, London

References

External links
 
 

1884 births
1967 deaths
Male actors from Surrey
English male film actors
English male silent film actors
20th-century English male actors
People educated at Reading School